Joseph Gilbert "Bill" Dillon (16 April 1933 – 17 April 1994) was a New Zealand politician of the Labour Party in the Fourth Labour Government of New Zealand.

Biography

Early life and career
Dillon studied at Auckland University College and graduated LLB in 1957. Dillon then entered the legal profession and joined the Hamilton legal firm of McCaw, Smith and Arcus in 1961, becoming a partner in 1963. He was also a member of the Territorial Force where he held the rank of Flying Officer.

Political career

Prior to entering Parliament Dillon was a member of the Auckland Harbour Board from 1971 to 1986 and was deputy-chairman from 1980 to 1981. He was also a member of the Hamilton Civic Trust and Hamilton District Law Society Council.

He represented the Hamilton East electorate in Parliament from 1984 to 1990, when he was defeated by Tony Steel, and the Labour Party was defeated overall by the National Party. While in Parliament Dillon was the Chair of the Justice and Law Reform committees. He was also a member of the Electoral, Foreign Affairs and State Owned Enterprises committees.

Later life and death
After losing his seat Dillon accepted an appointment as a judge of the Supreme Court in Samoa.

Dillon died aged 61 in Hamilton on 17 April 1994 following a short illness.

Notes

References

1933 births
1994 deaths
New Zealand Labour Party MPs
Unsuccessful candidates in the 1990 New Zealand general election
Members of the New Zealand House of Representatives
New Zealand MPs for North Island electorates
University of Auckland alumni
20th-century New Zealand judges
New Zealand judges on the courts of Samoa
Auckland Harbour Board members